Xia Xinyi (born 14 January 1997) is a Chinese beach volleyball player. She competed in the 2020 Summer Olympics.

References

1997 births
Living people
People from Ürümqi
Sportspeople from Xinjiang
Beach volleyball players at the 2020 Summer Olympics
Chinese female beach volleyball players
Olympic beach volleyball players of China
Asian Games medalists in beach volleyball
Beach volleyball players at the 2014 Asian Games
Beach volleyball players at the 2018 Asian Games
Medalists at the 2014 Asian Games
Medalists at the 2018 Asian Games
Asian Games gold medalists for China
21st-century Chinese women